Maru (also Romanized as Marū, Marow, and Marv) is a village in Darreh Seydi Rural District, in the Central District of Borujerd County, Lorestan Province, Iran. At the 2006 census, its population was 184, in 49 families.

References 

Towns and villages in Borujerd County